Progress MS-04, identified by NASA as Progress 65P, was a Progress mission launched by Roscosmos in an unsuccessful attempt to resupply the International Space Station (ISS).

Pre-launch 
The Progress MS-04 was launched into orbit on the Soyuz-U rocket before the switch to a new-generation Soyuz-2 family, which did not depend on avionics produced in Ukraine. This move to the new variant acquired a new political significance after the Kremlin's confrontation with Kyiv in 2014. However, inside the Russian space industry, this move became controversial after the loss of the Progress M-27M spacecraft on 28 April 2015, which was blamed on design features specific to the third stage of the Soyuz-2 rocket. Although the Soyuz-2 was officially declared fully operational in March 2016, there was lingering concern over this variant's reliability in the long term, stressing the need for a potential backup. The rocket issue remained open as the Progress MS-04 launch campaign got underway. The mission of Progress MS-04 was previously scheduled for 1 July 2016, but it later slipped back, along with the rest of the ISS flight manifest. Following the lengthy delay with the launch of the Soyuz MS-02 mission in September 2016, the liftoff of Progress MS-04 was rescheduled to 1 December 2016.

According to the flight schedule, Progress MS-04 was scheduled to dock at the Zvezda service module, on 3 December 2016, at 16:43:06 UTC, during the 34th orbit. The nominal docking was expected to be fully automated with Russian cosmonauts Sergey Ryzhikov and Oleg Novitsky at the inside of the station, ready to engage manual remote-control. Progress MS-04 carried a number of significant items, including the upgraded Orlan-MKS spacesuit for Russian spacewalks, a mini-greenhouse and an experimental system to recycle water and urine, the official Russian TASS news agency reported.

Launch failure 
Progress MS-04 was launched on 1 December 2016 at 14:51:52 UTC from the Baikonur Cosmodrome in Kazakhstan. It used the second to last Soyuz-U rocket. The Progress MS-04 mission was to use the two-day, 34-orbit trip to the station instead of the previously available six-hour rendezvous profile.

The launch proceeded normally until telemetry was lost at T+382.3 seconds, about two minutes into the Blok I stage burn. At this time, the Progress apparently separated from the third stage, almost six minutes earlier than nominal. A high altitude explosion was reported over the skies of Tuva, and debris from the third stage and Progress impacted in a mountainous area approximately 3500 km downrange from Baikonur. Roscosmos has confirmed the loss of Progress MS-04. The loss of the spacecraft occurred at an altitude of 190 km above deserted mountainous terrain in Tuva.

Cargo 
The Progress MS-04 spacecraft was carrying about 2450 kg of cargo and supplies to the International Space Station. The spacecraft was delivering food, fuel and supplies, including 705 kg of propellant, 50 kg of oxygen and air, and 420 kg of water. Progress MS-04 was scheduled to dock with the aft docking port of the Zvezda module.

Investigation 
On 3 December 2016, Roskosmos said that the Soyuz-U rocket with the Progress MS-04 spacecraft had been insured for 2,135 billion rubles through VTB Strakhovanie. The State Corporation also said that the Interagency Commission led by Roscosmos Head Igor Komarov and his Deputy Aleksandr Ivanov was scheduled to complete the investigation by 20 December 2016.

Preliminary investigation found that the Progress had separated from the third stage six minutes and 23 seconds into launch, and that third stage telemetry failed. The reason for the premature separation was unclear. Although the Blok I computer system was capable of issuing a manual shutoff command in the event of a malfunction, this could only occur if engine chamber pressure dropped below a certain level or the booster began deviating from its flight path and telemetry data up to the point of the malfunction indicated normal third stage performance. Sensing normal separation, the Progress began deploying its antennas and preparing to fire its propulsion system, but the Blok I was still thrusting and apparently collided with the spacecraft at least twice, sending it into a tailspin and possibly rupturing the instrument module. As evidence of this, the Progress began activating its thermal control system in response to loss of instrument module compartment temperatures. It was suspected that the loss of Blok I telemetry could have been caused by the collision with the Progress, which may have damaged antennas on the booster.

The separation command was normally issued by the third stage following engine cutoff, but the Progress could issue a backup command itself, which was maintained as a possible cause of the malfunction.

On 11 January 2017, Roscosmos announced the results of an investigation into the cause of the failure. Most likely, the oxygen pump of the Blok I third stage engine (11D55) caught fire and disintegrated, rupturing the oxygen tank. The fire was probably caused by "foreign particles" in the pump, or an assembly error. On 23 January 2017, Ivan Koptev, Director General of the Federal State Unitary Enterprise Voronezh Mechanical Plant resigned for unsatisfactory performance and quality of products.

On 28 January 2017, the Russian government announced as a result of the investigation into Progress MS-04 the recall of all Proton-M 2nd and 3rd stage engines produced by the Voronezh Mechanical Plant (common to the failed Progress flight) including the disassembly of three completed Proton rockets and a three and a half month suspension of flights. An investigation had found that engine parts that were supposed to use precious metals had been substituted for cheaper alternatives that were unable to resist high temperatures as well as finding that production and certification documentation were falsified.

References 

Progress (spacecraft) missions
Spacecraft launched in 2016
Spacecraft which reentered in 2016
2016 in Russia
Satellite launch failures
Supply vehicles for the International Space Station
Spacecraft launched by Soyuz-U rockets
2016 in Kazakhstan
Space accidents and incidents in Kazakhstan